Higgitt is a surname. Notable people with the surname include:

John Higgitt (1947–2006), British art historian and epigrapher
Rob Higgitt (born 1981), Welsh rugby union player 
William Higgitt (1917–1989), Canadian civil servant